Two vessels of the Royal Navy have been named HMS Thracian after the Thracians:
  was an 18-gun  brig-sloop commissioned into the Royal Navy in 1809. She was converted into a ship-sloop in 1822 and was broken up at Portsmouth in 1829.
  was an  built for the Royal Navy during the First World War. After running aground during the Battle of Hong Kong in 1941, she was commissioned into the Imperial Japanese Navy as Patrol Boat No. 101. The Royal Navy regained her at the end of the Second World War in 1945 and scrapped her in 1946.

References

 

Royal Navy ship names